The 1859 Minnesota gubernatorial election was held on November 8, 1859 to elect the governor of Minnesota.

Results

References

1859
Minnesota
gubernatorial
November 1859 events